Adil Hussain is an Indian actor who has worked in Indian cinema, including art house cinema and mainstream Bollywood, as well as international cinema, in films such as The Reluctant Fundamentalist and Life of Pi (both 2012).

He received National Film Awards (Special Jury) at the 2017 National Film Awards for Hotel Salvation and Maj Rati Keteki.

He has starred in English, Hindi, Assamese, Bengali, Tamil, Marathi, Malayalam, Norwegian and French films.

Early life and education
Born in Goalpara, Assam in 1963, where his father was the headmaster of a high secondary school, Hussain was the youngest of seven children.

In an interview he described his multiethnic background, as his maternal grandfather was Iraqi while his maternal grandmother had Assamese, English and Italian roots.

Hussain acted in school plays.

He left home at age 18 to study philosophy at B. Borooah College, Guwahati, he started acting in college plays and performing as a stand-up comedian.

He also mimicked popular Bollywood actors in between the performances of a local stand-up comedian group, the Bhaya Mama Group. He worked as a stand-up comedian for six years, joined a mobile theatre and also did some local cinema, before moving to Delhi, where he studied at National School of Drama (1990–1993).

He also studied at the Drama Studio London on a Charles Wallace India Trust Scholarship.

Career
After his return to India in 1994, Hussain joined the mobile 'Hengul Theater' in Assam, where he worked for three years, before moving to Delhi. He started his stage career in Delhi, though he continued training under Khalid Tyabji. After Tyabji he trained with Swapan Bose at Sri Aurobindo Ashram, Puducherry, before starting training with Dilip Shankar in Delhi.

As an actor, he first received acclaim in Othello: A Play in Black and White (1999), which was awarded the Edinburgh Fringe First, and later Goodbye Desdemona also directed by Roysten Abel. He remained the artistic director and Trainer of the Society for Artists and Performers in Hampi from 2004 to 2007, and a visiting faculty at Royal Conservatory of Performing Arts, The Hague. He is also a visiting faculty at his alma mater, the National School of Drama.

In 2004, he made his Bengali film debut along with Soha Ali Khan in the period drama Iti Srikanta, where he played the lead role.

On television, he appeared in the lead role, in the detective series Jasoos Vijay (2002–2003), produced by BBC World Service Trust.

Though he had appeared in a few Assamese films, did a small roles in Vishal Bhardwaj's Kaminey and Sona Jain's For Real, it was his role in Abhishek Chaubey's Ishqiya (2010) that got him attention in Bollywood, though his first major role was in Saif Ali Khan-Kareena Kapoor Khan starrer Agent Vinod released in early 2012. In the same year, he appeared in Italian director Italo Spinelli's Gangor, Mira Nair's The Reluctant Fundamentalist, and Ang Lee's Life of Pi.

He next appeared alongside Sridevi in the comedy drama English Vinglish (2012), and also received critical acclaim for his role in Lessons in Forgetting at the New Jersey Independent South Asian Cine Fest. After these he acted in Aditya Bhattacharya's Bombay Most Wanted and Partho Sen-Gupta's Sunrise.

His next role as Inspector K. N. Singh was in the Ranveer Singh-Sonakshi Sinha Lootera under Vikramaditya Motwane's direction. This followed with Amit Vats' comedy Boyss Toh Boyss Hain, the story of four young men with similar problems in life, who eventually find their way to true love.

Hussain opened 2014 with the Assamese film Raag: The Rhythm of Love playing Iqbal, which marked his first Assamese film in a lead role. Sringkhal and Rodor Sithi were his other Assamese releases in the year. He was also seen in Hindi films like Kaanchi: The Unbreakable as a CBI officer, The Xposé as Rajan starring Himesh Reshammiya in the lead, and Tigers as Bilal starring Emraan Hashmi. Tigers, based on a real-life story about a salesman, was screened at the 2014 Toronto International Film Festival. His first lead role in a Hindi film came with the drama Zed Plus as Aslam Puncturewala.

Hussain had his maximum number of film appearances in 2015 as he had releases in English, Hindi, Bengali and his first Tamil and Marathi movies. His Hindi movies include Main Aur Charles as Amod Kant, Jai Ho Democracy as Major Baruah, and Angry Indian Goddesses as a police superintendent. He debuted in Tamil cinema with Yatchan portraying the significant role of Selvam/Vetri, He also worked in his first Marathi movie Sunrise as Joshi. His Bengali film of the year was Arindam Sil's mystery thriller Har Har Byomkesh as Zamindar Deepnarayan Singh.

His 2016 projects include the drama film Parched directed by Leena Yadav, which premiered at the Special Presentations section of the 2015 Toronto International Film Festival. It is about four women who lead a tightly controlled-by-traditions life in a village in Rajasthan. His other project in the year is the action thriller Force 2 directed by Abhinay Deo featuring John Abraham and Sonakshi Sinha in the lead. His Assamese film in 2016 is Kothanodi. Adil Hussain's 2017 releases include Commando 2: The Black Money Trail, Love Sonia, Mantra, Mukti Bhawan, Dobaara: See Your Evil, Kabuliwala, and Naval Enna Jewel.

In 2018, he acted in S. Shankar's 2.0 as well as in Aiyaary and Bioscopewala. In 2022, Hussain became the first-ever personality to hoist the Indian National Flag in the Metaverse at the 'Azadi Ka Amrit Mahotsav' Metaverse event organised by Piro Space.

Life membership
In 2013, after having conducted a film workshop at University Film Club, Aligarh Muslim University, Hussain was granted a lifetime membership in the university's film club.

Hussain has been honoured by Sandeep Marwah with the life membership of International Film And Television Club of Asian Academy of Film & Television at Noida Film City.

Personal life
During the 1999 Edinburgh Film Festival, Hussain, cast as Othello, fell in love with Kristen Jain, who was playing Desdemona. He ended up tightly hugging her, much to her and the audience's shock, instead of "killing" her as per the script, thus forcing the curtains to be brought down immediately. They eventually got married eight years later, in 2007.

Filmography

Short films

National film awards

Norwegian National Film Award for Best Actor award of Amanda Award What Will People Say

Other awards and nominations

References

External links

1963 births
Living people
Male actors in Hindi cinema
Indian male film actors
Indian male stage actors
Indian male television actors
National School of Drama alumni
Alumni of the Drama Studio London
Assamese people
Indian people of Iraqi descent
Indian people of English descent
Indian people of Italian descent
People from Goalpara district
Assamese-language actors
Indian drama teachers
Special Mention (feature film) National Film Award winners